From Sanskrit, Pandya's are majorly associated with their ancestorial heroes whom they chose to pray as gods. It means 'scholar' or 'teacher'. At many Places it also refer as Pandey or Pandit.

Pandya is an Indian(specially Gujarati) surname  and may be:

 Paritosh Pandya, Indian computer scientist
 Vidhi Pandya, Indian television actress
 Pranav Pandya, politician
 Hardik Pandya, Indian international cricketer
 Haren Pandya, Indian politician
 Jinal Pandya, Telugu actress
 Krunal Pandya, Indian international cricketer

See also
 Pandya
 Pandya dynasty 
 Pandya Kingdom (Mahabharata)
 Pandyan Civil War (1169–1177)
 Pandya Nadu